

Episodes

Season 1 (1989)

Season 2 (1989–1990)

Season 3 (1990–1991)

Season 4 (1991–1992)

Season 5 (1992–1993)

Season 6 (1993–1994)

Season 7 (1994–1995)

Season 8 (1995–1996)

Season 9 (1996-1997)

Season 10 (1997–1998)

Season 11 (1998–1999)

Season 12 (1999–2000)

Season 13 (2000–2001)

Season 14 (2001–2002)

Season 15 (2002–2003)

Season 16 (2003–2004)

Season 17 (2004-2005)

Season 18 (2005–2006)

Season 19 (2006–2007)

Season 20 (2007–2008)

References

External links 
 
 

Lists of American crime television series episodes